The 1984 European Parliament election in Luxembourg was the election of the delegation from Luxembourg to the European Parliament in 1984.  It was held on 17 June 1984, the same day as the legislative elections to the Chamber of Deputies.

Results

References

Luxembourg
European Parliament elections in Luxembourg
1984 in Luxembourg